The Royal Thai Government Gazette, frequently abbreviated to Government Gazette (GG) or Royal Gazette (RG), is the public journal and newspaper of record of Thailand. Laws passed by the government generally come into force after publication in the GG. The Royal Thai Government Gazette was the first Thai-language newspaper to appear in the kingdom and is also one of the earliest newspapers in Asia that is still in publication. The Cabinet Secretariat, a department in the Office of the Prime Minister, is charged with printing the GG.

History 
The GG was first issued on 15 March 1858 by King Rama IV to inform government officials and the general public of news about the country. King Rama III had previously had 9,000 copies printed of a Decree Forbidding Opium Smoking and Sale in 1839. Previously, royal scribes had been compiling decrees by hand. Because of the many difficulties that this entailed, King Rama IV accordingly had a printing press set up inside the Grand Palace to publish the GG with government proclamations and regulations for officials and the public. It is likely that most of the announcements that appeared in the GG at the time were penned by King Rama IV himself.

Publication ceased 18 months later as the king had no time to edit it, so announcements were printed and distributed separately. In May 1874, King Rama V restarted the Government Gazette as a weekly, giving it serial number one.

It was discontinued again in 1879 before reappearing for the Bangkok Centennial celebrations in 1882 as Government Gazette Special.

In 1884 the GG restarted and has been printed ever since. It was modified somewhat in 1889, bringing it closer to Western standards, such as the London Gazette. It included general announcements by the government, royal commands, acts of legislation, ministerial regulations, news of royal visits, royal ceremonies, religious items, announcements of royal decorations and ranks, royal obituaries, and the price of unhusked rice. The subscription price was eight baht per year, if picked up from the printing house, or ten baht if delivered to the subscriber's home.

References

External links 
  

Thai, Government Gazette
Newspapers published in Thailand
Law of Thailand
Government of Thailand
Publications established in 1858